Gerana sometimes also called Oenoe is a queen of the Pygmy folk in Greek mythology, who incurred the wrath of the goddess Hera and was subsequently turned into a bird bearing her name, the crane. This aetiological tale explains the ancient rivalry between the Pygmies and the cranes, and also serves as a cautionary tale against the people who hubristically claimed to be better than even the gods themselves. Gerana's story bears some resemblance to that of Lamia, who was also a beautiful woman cursed by Hera and transformed into something unappealing.

Etymology 
It derives from the Proto-Indo-European root *gerh2-en-/-eu-, meaning the same thing; cognate with the English word 'crane.' It seems to be attested in Mycenaean Greek in the dative plural form gerenai (Linear B: , ke-re-na-i), though Beekes expressed some doubt over it.

Mythology 
According to Antoninus Liberalis, who attributes the story to the Hellenistic writer Boeus, she was born to the Pygmies, a very beautiful but graceless girl who shunned the worship of Hera and Artemis. She married Nicodamas, who unlike her was good and sensible, and had a son by him, Mopsus. The other Pygmies brought many gifts for the newborn infant, but Hera, enraged that Gerana would not worship her, elongated her neck and turned her into a crane. Wishing to keep close to her child, Gerana as a crane would fly from roof to roof, but the people armed themselves and chased her away, and thus rose the rivalry between the Pygmies and cranes. Athenaeus, who also quotes Boeus in his Deipnosophistae, says that according to him Gerana was worshipped as a goddess by her people, while she herself only had contempt for goddesses like Artemis and Hera, so Hera turned her into a crane, a bird considered ugly, and further made the Pygmies hate cranes. Apparently he also wrote that Gerana and Nicodamas became the parents of a tortoise.

Gerana and her fate was woven by the goddess Athena in her tapestry during her weaving contest with the Lydian Arachne, as a warning against the girl about the fate of those who dare to compare themselves to the gods. Ovid says that Gerana saw herself as equal to the Heavens, so Hera turned her into a crane after besting her in some contest and forced her to wage war against her own people; perhaps Gerana boasted of being more beautiful than the queen of gods.

Antoninus Liberalis calls this woman Oenoe, (meaning 'wine-y') while Ovid does not give her a name at all; it is Athenaeus and Aelian, a third century AD author, who call her Gerana. Aelian says that the Pygmies worshipped their beautiful queen Gerana as a goddess, paying her honours above a those fit for a human. Gerana claimed to surpass Hera, Artemis, Athena and Aphrodite all in beauty, so Hera transformed her into a hideous crane. Eustathius, a Byzantine scholar, repeats the same tale.

The first lines in the third book of the Iliad implies that this tale, or at least a version of it, might had been known as early as Homer (eighth century BC). According to Russian philologist Irina V. Shtal, an earlier–now lost–epic poem called the Geranomachia ("battle against the cranes"), one of the many light-hearted parodies of the Iliad written in the antiquity, was erroneously attributed to Homer in antiquity.

Joseph Fontenrose in turn identifies Gerana with Lamia, another mythological woman punished by Hera and turned into a hideous beast. Fontenrose notes that they are both beautiful queens connected to Africa who enrage Hera, undergo transformation as punishment at her hands and are deprived of their children.

See also 

 Antigone of Troy
 Cassiopeia
 Periphas
 Side

Footnotes

Notes

References 

 
 Antoninus Liberalis, The Metamorphoses of Antoninus Liberalis translated by Francis Celoria (Routledge 1992). Online version at the Topos Text Project.
 
 
 
 
 
 
 
  Online version at Perseus.tufts Library.
  Online version at Perseus.tufts Library.
  Online version at the Perseus Digital Library.
 
  Online version at Perseus.tufts Library.

External links 
 PYGMIES on the Theoi Project
 

Africa in Greek mythology
Metamorphoses into birds in Greek mythology
Women in Greek mythology
Deeds of Hera
Metamorphoses characters
Queens in Greek mythology
Legendary birds